Morris Brown Jr. (August, 1842 – June 22, 1864) was an American soldier who received the Medal of Honor for valor during the American Civil War.

Biography
Brown was attending Hamilton College when he joined the Union Army in August 1862. At Hamilton he was a member of Chi Psi fraternity. He served in the 126th New York Infantry, and by the time of his death was, as a captain, the senior living officer of his regiment. He was killed in action on June 22, 1864 at Petersburg, Virginia. He was posthumously awarded the Medal of Honor on March 6, 1869 for his actions at the Battle of Gettysburg which included the capture of a large number of Confederates as well as the heroic capture of a Confederate flag.

A book detailing his exploits during the Civil War was released in 2012 and is entitled "Fight All Day, March All Night" by Wayne Mahood.

Two other men of the 126th New York Infantry won the Medal of Honor for their actions at Gettysburg, Jerry Wall and George H. Dore.

Medal of Honor citation
Citation:

Capture of flag.

See also

List of Medal of Honor recipients for the Battle of Gettysburg
List of American Civil War Medal of Honor recipients: A–F

References

External links
Biographical article

Military Times

1842 births
1864 deaths
Union Army soldiers
United States Army Medal of Honor recipients
People of New York (state) in the American Civil War
Union military personnel killed in the American Civil War
People from Hammondsport, New York
American Civil War recipients of the Medal of Honor
Burials at Lake View Cemetery (Penn Yan, New York)